The Dronne (also ,) is a  long river in southwestern France, right tributary of the Isle. It flows south-west through the following départements and towns:

 Haute-Vienne
 Dordogne: Saint-Pardoux-la-Rivière, Brantôme, Ribérac
 Charente: Aubeterre-sur-Dronne
 Charente-Maritime
 Gironde: Coutras

The Dronne flows into the Isle in Coutras.

Among its tributaries are the Lizonne and the Côle.

References

Rivers of France
Rivers of Dordogne
Rivers of Gironde
Rivers of Haute-Vienne
Rivers of Nouvelle-Aquitaine